is a town located in Ishikari, Hokkaido, Japan.

As of September 2016, the town has an estimated population of 16,694, and a density of 39 persons per km2. The total area is 422.71 km2.

Geography
Located in the north part of Ishikari Subprefecture of Hokkaido, the shape of the municipality is elongated from north to south. It overlaps with the catchment area of the Tōbetsu river approximately. Tōbetsu means "river from marsh" in Ainu language, and in Japanese, it is called "Tōbetsu Gawa (river)". Low mountains occupy the northern area of the municipality. The southern area is a part of the Ishikari Plains.

Sapporo, the largest city of Hokkaido, lies southwest of Tōbetsu. The large river of Ishikari divided Tōbetsu from Sapporo until 1934 when the Sasshō Line railroad connected the two cities. Several more bridges built in the latter half of the 20th century have reduced the traffic obstacle. Tōbetsu has produced rice and, recently, flowers. Residential buildings are increasing modestly because of their better access to Sapporo.

History
1902 - Tōbetsu village was founded.
1947 - Tōbetsu village became Tōbetsu town.

Sister cities
 Leksand, Dalarna, Sweden (since 1987)
 Osaki, Miyagi (since 2000)
 Uwajima, Ehime (since 2009)

Education

University
 Health Sciences University of Hokkaido

High schools
 Hokkaido Tobetsu High School

Transportation
 Sasshō Line: Ishikari-Futomi - Ishikari-Tōbetsu - Hokkaidō-Iryōdaigaku

Mascot 

Tōbetsu's mascot is  who is a 5-year-old Eurasian tree sparrow who lives in the forests of Tōbetsu. Not only is he is a Jidaigeki actor, but he also has samurai ancestors that belong to the Date clan. Despite his age, he will arm himself with a golden katana if anyone tries to mess with an innocent. He wears a kimono made from an annual baby's breath with an obe made from an Asian white birch and a green and gold kabuto with the kanji "tō" (当) painted on it as good luck. He also wears white war paint around his eyes to strike fear amongst his enemies. As a result, he is mistaken for a ural owl. His birthday is October 2. He is designed by Yasuka Arai.

Notable people from Tōbetsu
 Tatsunori Arai, football player

See also
 Sweden Hills

References

External links

Official Website 

Towns in Hokkaido